The Pirate Fairy (originally titled as Tinker Bell and the River of Doom or alternatively Tinker Bell and the Pirate Fairy) is a 2014 American 3D computer-animated fantasy film directed by Peggy Holmes. It is the fifth direct-to-video feature-length animated film in the Disneytoon Studios' Tinker Bell film series and the Disney Fairies franchise, based on the character Tinker Bell from J. M. Barrie's Peter and Wendy. The film features the voices of Mae Whitman, reprising her role of Tinker Bell, Christina Hendricks as a dust-keeper fairy named Zarina, and Tom Hiddleston as a much younger James Hook.

Plot
Zarina, an inquisitive fairy, is amazed by the magic behind pixie dust and is determined to learn more. She secretly experiments with blue pixie dust, creating variants; however, experiments with the pink variant grow wildly out of control, causing an accident in Pixie Hollow. Her supervisor, Fairy Gary, prohibits her from working with pixie dust. In sorrow, Zarina takes her experiments and runs away.

One year later, Pixie Hollow celebrates the Four Seasons Festival with performances from fairies of all the seasons. During the show, Tinker Bell, Silvermist, Iridessa, Rosetta, Fawn, and Vidia spot Zarina flying around the audience and using pink pixie dust to summon poppies that cause everyone to fall asleep. Tink and her friends, who take cover, realize Zarina stole all of the blue pixie dust, which is used to create the yellow dust that fairies use to fly.

They follow Zarina to the coast, where she became the captain of a pirate crew, including a young James Hook, who is apparently the cabin boy. The fairies retrieve the blue dust for a moment, but Zarina retrieves it after throwing multi-colored pixie dust at them that switches their talents. Tinker Bell becomes a water fairy, Silvermist a fast-flying fairy, Fawn a light fairy, Iridessa a garden fairy, Rosetta an animal fairy, and Vidia a tinker fairy (much to her horror and disgust). They struggle with their swapped talents as they search for Zarina and the pirate ship, in the process meeting a baby crocodile that takes a liking to Rosetta's new animal talent.

They find the ship and sneak in, where they overhear Hook talking about how the pirates met Zarina after drifting off course, and she became the captain with the promise of making the ship fly so that they could plunder anything without getting caught. The ship arrives at Skull Rock, where the fairies discover the pirates' camp and a mysterious Pixie Dust Tree, which Zarina has grown using the pink pixie dust.

The fairies attempt to retrieve the blue pixie dust but are caught when Iridessa loses control over her nature talent and reveals their location. Tink tries to convince Zarina to return home to Pixie Hollow, but she refuses because she feels unappreciated. With the fairies now captured, the pirates make regular flying pixie dust. Hook, curious about flying, convinces Zarina to use some on him. After joyfully flying around the cave, Hook double-crosses Zarina and traps her in a lantern, revealing himself as the real captain.

Tinker Bell and the others fail to escape their imprisonment until the baby crocodile arrives and frees them. The fairies almost retrieve the blue pixie dust, but Hook threatens to throw Zarina into the sea unless they hand it over. Tink gives it up, and Hook sprinkles it over the ship before throwing Zarina overboard.

As the pirates sail towards the Second Star, the fairies return and use their switched talents to defeat the pirates and turn the ship. Zarina attempts to retrieve the blue pixie dust from Hook, who chases after her. Zarina gains a speck of blue pixie dust which she throws at Hook, who starts flying crazily as the two kinds of pixie dust react to each other. As the fairies fly away, Hook swears revenge on them and is attacked by the baby crocodile. Zarina returns the blue pixie dust to Tink and her friends, before preparing to leave. Tinker Bell offers her a chance to return to Pixie Hollow and she accepts, helping her friends sail the ship back. The other fairies wake up with no recollection of what happened.

Zarina is about to promise not to tamper with pixie dust again, but Tink convinces her to show off her abilities, restoring Tink and her friends' original fairy talents and allowing them to put on a beautiful Festival performance. Everyone congratulates them, and Zarina's alchemy talent is finally accepted.

Cast 

 Mae Whitman as Tinker Bell, a tinker fairy and Periwinkle's twin sister.
 Christina Hendricks as Zarina, an unusually skilled and inquisitive dust-keeper fairy.
 Tom Hiddleston as James Hook, the captain of the pirate ship disguised as the cabin boy.
 Lucy Liu as Silvermist, a water fairy.
 Raven-Symoné as Iridessa, a light fairy.
 Megan Hilty as Rosetta, a garden fairy.
 Pamela Adlon as Vidia, a fast-flying fairy.
 Angela Bartys as Fawn, an animal fairy.
 Jim Cummings as Oppenheimer and Port, two of James' crew members.
 Carlos Ponce as Bonito, one of James' crew members.
 Mick Wingert as Starboard, one of James' crew members.
 Kevin Michael Richardson as Yang, one of James' crew members.
 Jeff Bennett voices three characters in the film:
Clank, a large tinker fairy with a booming voice.
Fairy Gary, a large dust-keeper fairy.
Mr. Smee, a crew member from The Jolly Roger who meets James.
 Rob Paulsen as Bobble, a wispy tinker fairy with large glasses and Clank's best friend.
 Grey DeLisle as MC Fairy / Gliss.
 Kari Wahlgren as Sweetpea / Sydney.
 Jane Horrocks as Fairy Mary, the overseer of all tinker fairies.
 Anjelica Huston as Queen Clarion, the queen of Pixie Hollow.

Production
The film was originally titled Quest for the Queen. Peggy Holmes, co-director of Secret of the Wings signed on to direct the film. It introduced new characters, Zarina, voiced by Christina Hendricks, and James aka young Captain Hook, voiced by Tom Hiddleston. Carlos Ponce also lent his voice to one of the characters in the film.

Disney announced in January 2014 that former Project Runway winner and fashion designer Christian Siriano would be in charge of creating the ensemble costumes for the fairies, specifically Zarina. Siriano stated that "I loved the challenge of this project. I haven't designed for an animated character before, and I'm excited to take my skills into Zarina's world. She's a unique and new character and I wanted to help make her memorable and iconic. Disney characters are everlasting and I'm so happy as a young designer to help create a bit of Disney history."

Release
The film was released internationally in theaters with the title Tinker Bell and the Pirate Fairy on February 13, 2014, and later dates, with 2D and 3D screenings available. In the United States the screenings took place exclusively at the El Capitan Theater in Hollywood, from February 28 to March 19, 2014. It was originally scheduled for Fall 2013, before another DisneyToon Studios film, Planes, took its place, delaying the film to Spring 2014.

Marketing
A trailer for the film was released on the Secret of the Wings Blu-ray and DVD on October 23, 2012.
The Pirate Fairy is the first film of the Tinker Bell series not to allude to the Disney Fairies brand in promotional material and not to display the brand logo at the beginning of the film, showing instead the DisneyToon Studios logo.

Home media
The film was released by Walt Disney Studios Home Entertainment on DVD and Blu-ray in the United States on April 1, 2014, and in the United Kingdom on June 23, 2014.
Bonus features of the DVD include a documentary and two animated shorts. The Blu-ray contains the bonus features of the DVD and additions such as deleted scenes, sing-along songs and a making-of clip of "The Frigate That Flies" song with actor Tom Hiddleston.

During the pre-order period of the combo pack with the DVD, Blu-ray and Digital Copy versions of the film, a limited edition set of four lithographs featuring shots from the film would be included with the order.
Several stores also released exclusive sets which bundled the combo pack with a certain item of the Disney Fairies merchandise, such as a bonus DVD with the animated short Pixie Hollow Bake Off and 10 other mini-shorts, the storybook and read-along CD of The Pirate Fairy film, a set of six wall decal sheets, and a glitter brush.

Reception
On review aggregation website Rotten Tomatoes, the film has a rating of 81% based on 21 reviews, with an average score of 6.39/10.

Soundtrack
The film was scored by Joel McNeely, who has also scored the previous films in the Tinker Bell series.

Songs
The soundtrack features an original song titled "Who I Am," performed by Natasha Bedingfield, as well as Bedingfield's previously released song, "Weightless," which was initially used on the film's scratch recording but was so well received, director Peggy Holmes decided to make it permanent.

Another original song, "The Frigate That Flies," with music by Gaby Alter and lyrics by Gaby Alter and Itamar Moses, is performed in the film by the pirate crew as a musical number.

References

External links

 
 

2014 films
2010s American animated films
2014 fantasy films
2014 computer-animated films
2014 direct-to-video films
2010s English-language films
American animated fantasy films
Films set in England
Disney direct-to-video animated films
DisneyToon Studios animated films
Films directed by Peggy Holmes
Films scored by Joel McNeely
Films with screenplays by John Lasseter
American swashbuckler films
Pirate films
Tinker Bell (film series)
Films with screenplays by Peggy Holmes